Bassirou Compaoré (born 23 April 1998) is a Burkinabé international footballer who plays for Spanish club CF Rayo Majadahonda, as a forward.

Career
He played for AS SONABEL, Ittihad Tanger, Chabab Atlas Khénifra and Club Africain.

He made his international debut for Burkina Faso in 2017.

References

1998 births
Living people
Burkinabé footballers
Burkina Faso international footballers
AS SONABEL players
Ittihad Tanger players
Chabab Atlas Khénifra players
Botola players
Association football midfielders
Burkinabé expatriate footballers
Burkinabé expatriate sportspeople in Morocco
Expatriate footballers in Morocco
Club Africain players
Burkinabé expatriate sportspeople in Tunisia
Expatriate footballers in Tunisia
CF Rayo Majadahonda players
Burkinabé expatriate sportspeople in Spain
21st-century Burkinabé people
Expatriate footballers in Spain
CD Tudelano footballers
Primera Federación players